Lieutenant-Colonel Ítalo Ángel Piaggi (17 March 1935; San Fernando, Argentina – 31 July 2012, Buenos Aires) was an Argentine Army commander who was involved in the Battle of Goose Green in the Falklands War.

The defending Argentine army forces known as Task Force Mercedes consisted of the Lieutenant-Colonel Italo Piaggi's 12th Infantry Regiment (RI 12) and a company of the 25th Infantry Regiment (RI 25).

The day after the battle Lieutenant-Colonel Piaggi surrendered all Argentine forces, approximately 1,000 men, including 202 men of the Air Force.  He was later drummed out of the army in disgrace.

In 1986, he wrote the book Ganso Verde (a calque of "Goose Green", using the colour green to translate [Village] Green), where he makes a strong defence of his decisions during the war and criticises the lack of logistical support from the Argentine commander-in-chief in Stanley. He estimates that Task Force Mercedes only disposed 28 per cent of their intended firepower regarding artillery, mortars and heavy machine guns.

Notes

References

 
 
Kenney Oak, David J. 2 Para's Battle for Darwin Hill and Goose Green. Square Press April 2006. . See here
Falklands War Binderbook - Author Information Pending
Andrada, Benigno: Guerra aérea en las Malvinas. Ed. Emecé, 1983. . 
Piaggi, Italo A.: Ganso Verde. Ed. Planeta, 1986. .  

1936 births
2012 deaths
Argentine military personnel of the Falklands War
Argentine prisoners of war
Argentine people of Italian descent
Argentine Army officers
People from Buenos Aires Province